Vernonia dranensis is a species of flowering plant in the family Asteraceae. It is native to Vietnam.

References

dranensis
Flora of Vietnam